Kendrick Perry (born December 23, 1992) is an American-Montenegrin professional basketball player for Unicaja of the Spanish Liga ACB and the Basketball Champions League. He played college basketball at Youngstown State University.

High school career
Perry attended Edgewater High School in Orlando, Florida where he was a three-year letter winner and a two-time captain. As a senior, he averaged 16 points and eight assists per game, helping Edgewater to the FHSAA District 6A-4 championship. He was a second-team Class 6A selection by the Florida Sports Writers and a third-team choice by FloridaHoops.com. He was also first-team all-area and all-metro area selection.

College career
In his freshman season at Youngstown State, Perry scored in double figures in 15 games with a then career-high 21-point performance against Loyola on January 27, 2011. In 30 games (23 starts), he averaged 9.0 points, 3.6 rebounds, 4.1 assists and 1.3 steals in 29.2 minutes per game.

In his sophomore season, he was named to the All-Horizon League first team and the NABC All-District second team. In 31 games (all starts), he averaged 16.8 points, 3.3 rebounds, 3.9 assists and 2.4 steals in 34.8 minutes per game.

In his junior season, he was named to the All-Horizon League first team and the NABC All-District first team. In 30 games (29 starts), he averaged 17.3 points, 5.5 rebounds, 4.1 assists and 1.9 steals in 35.4 minutes per game.

In his senior season, he was named to the All-Horizon League first team for the third year in a row. He was also named to the NABC All-District first team and the Capital One Academic All-America second team. On March 4, 2014, he tied a career-high 35 points in the first round of the Horizon League Tournament against Oakland. In 32 games (all starts), he averaged 21.3 points, 4.1 rebounds, 4.4 assists and 2.4 steals in 36.5 minutes per game.

Professional career

2014–15 season
After going undrafted in the 2014 NBA draft, Perry joined the Orlando Magic for the 2014 NBA Summer League. On July 23, 2014, he signed with the Sydney Kings for the 2014–15 NBL season. In 28 games for the Kings, Perry averaged 10.4 points, 3.6 rebounds, 2.4 assists and 1.1 steals per game.

On March 19, 2015, Perry was acquired by the Iowa Energy of the NBA Development League. He made his debut for the Energy the following day, scoring two points in 15 minutes of action in a win over the Fort Wayne Mad Ants.

Europe
On August 12, 2015, Perry signed with BC Körmend of the Hungarian Nemzeti Bajnokság I/A.

On September 6, 2016, Perry signed with Macedonian club Karpoš Sokoli for the 2016–17 season. On July 3, 2018, he signed with Nizhny Novgorod. On July 20, 2019, he has signed with Levallois Metropolitans of the LNB Pro A. 

On December 18, 2019, Perry signed with Mega Bemax of the ABA League. On May 22, 2020, he signed with Cedevita Olimpija. 

On June 30, 2021, he signed with Panathinaikos of the Greek Basket League and the EuroLeague. In 19 EuroLeague games, Perry played 16.4 minutes per contest and averaged a paltry 4.8 points, 1.7 rebounds, and 1.6 assists, shooting with 32.1% from the field and 32.6% from beyond the 3-point arc.

On January 23, 2022, Perry transferred from Panathinaikos to the Montenegrin club Budućnost VOLI for the rest of the season.

On June 13, 2022, Perry signed with Unicaja of the Spanish Liga ACB.

Personal
Perry is the son of Deborah and Aubrey Perry, Jr., and has a brother also named Aubrey.

References

External links
FIBA profile
Youngstown State bio

1992 births
Living people
ABA League players
American expatriate basketball people in Australia
American expatriate basketball people in Greece
American expatriate basketball people in Hungary
American expatriate basketball people in Montenegro
American expatriate basketball people in North Macedonia
American expatriate basketball people in Serbia
American expatriate basketball people in Spain
American expatriate basketball people in Slovenia
American men's basketball players
Baloncesto Málaga players
Basketball players from Florida
BC Körmend players
BC Nizhny Novgorod players
Iowa Energy players
KK Cedevita Olimpija players
KK Mega Basket players
Liga ACB players
Metropolitans 92 players
Montenegrin men's basketball players
Montenegrin expatriate basketball people in Serbia
Montenegrin people of African-American descent
Naturalized citizens of Montenegro
Panathinaikos B.C. players
Point guards
Sportspeople from Orange County, Florida
Sydney Kings players
Szolnoki Olaj KK players
Youngstown State Penguins men's basketball players